Tuva'a Clifton (born 29 June 1997) is a Samoan canoeist. He competed in the men's K-1 1000 metres event at the 2020 Summer Olympics. He made the team via the quota place for Samoa after achieving a time within the limit in a qualification heat.

Clifton's family comes from Samoa and New Zealand, with Clifton spending his early life in New Zealand. Before becoming a kayaker, Clifton was a lifesaver at Muriwai Beach in New Zealand. Clifton has two sisters, with one of them taking part in a national kayaking programme in New Zealand.

References

External links
 

1997 births
Living people
Samoan male canoeists
Olympic canoeists of Samoa
Canoeists at the 2020 Summer Olympics
Place of birth missing (living people)